The Little River is a tributary of the Neuse River, which originates in Moore's Pond, south of Youngsville in Franklin County. The river crosses through Wake, Johnston, and Wayne counties, joining the Neuse at Waynesborough State Park and Busco Beach just east of Goldsboro. Wake County and the City of Raleigh have been purchasing land in the watershed in order to create a reservoir in northeast Wake County.

Cities & towns in the Little Creek watershed 
 Archer Lodge, NC
 Goldsboro, North Carolina
 Kenly, NC
 Micro, NC
 Princeton, NC
 Rolesville, NC
 Wake Forest, NC
 Wendell, NC
 Youngsville, NC
 Zebulon, NC

See also
List of rivers of North Carolina

References 

Rivers of North Carolina
Tributaries of Pamlico Sound
Rivers of Franklin County, North Carolina
Rivers of Johnston County, North Carolina
Rivers of Wake County, North Carolina
Rivers of Wayne County, North Carolina